Örebro County is a county or län in central Sweden. It borders the counties of Västra Götaland, Värmland, Dalarna, Västmanland, Södermanland and Östergötland. It is frequently culturally divided into the hilly northern region of Bergslagen, where mining and metallurgic industry have been important since the Middle Ages, and the southern Mälardalen of lakes and farms.

Province 
Sweden's counties are primarily administrative units, whereas the provinces of Sweden usually fit cultural and historical boundaries. Örebro County consists of the province of Närke, the western half of Västmanland and minor parts of eastern Värmland and northeastern Västergötland. Örebro County is named after its capital city, Örebro, which in 2010 was the sixth largest city of Sweden. Official 2010 numbers sourced in the localities section indicate that 38% of the county population is living in the city of Örebro alone. Örebro itself contains just as many inhabitants as the 23 other largest localities put together, and has grown significantly ever since the official statistics began in the late 1960s.

Administration 
The county was named Närke and Värmland County until 1779 when Värmland County seceded.

The main aim of the County Administrative Board is to fulfil the goals set in  national politics by the Riksdag and the Government, to coordinate the interests of the county, to promote the development of the county, to establish regional goals and safeguard the due process of law in the handling of each case. The County Administrative Board is a Government Agency headed by a Governor. See List of Örebro Governors.

Politics 

The County Council of Örebro or Örebro läns landsting, which is appointed by the electorate of the county, is primarily responsible for health care and public transportation.

Riksdag elections
The table details all Riksdag election results of Örebro County since the unicameral era began in 1970. The blocs denote which party would support the Prime Minister or the lead opposition party towards the end of the elected parliament.

Geography and climate 

The southern Närke plain, the forested north and the highland to the west makes for a varying landscape. Örebro County is located between the four major lakes of Sweden and has coastlines on two of them. Capital Örebro is alongside Hjälmaren, located slightly inland along Svartån. The proximity to the major lakes moderates winter temperatures somewhat, undermining the continental effects of its inland position. The northern areas of the county are slightly cooler year-round. The summer temperatures on the Närke Plain are some of the warmest in all of Scandinavia and by extension Northern Europe.

Municipalities 

Örebro County is divided into 12 municipalities.

Localities (2018 Statistics Sweden estimates)

Demographics

Population

Foreign background 
SCB have collected statistics on backgrounds of residents since 2002. These tables consist of all who have two foreign-born parents or are born abroad themselves. The chart lists election years and the last year on record alone.

Heraldry 

The arms for the County of Örebro is a combination of the arms of Närke, Västmanland and Värmland. When it is shown with a royal crown it represents the County Administrative Board.

See also 
Duke of Närke, a title for members of the royal family (see Duchies in Sweden)

References and notes

External links 

County Administrative Board of Örebro

 
Counties of Sweden

1779 establishments in Sweden
States and territories established in 1779